Cirsonella consobrina is a minute sea snail, a marine gastropod mollusc in the family Skeneidae.

Description
The height of the shell attains 0.8 mm -, its diameter 1.2 mm.

Distribution
This marine is endemic to New Zealand and was found off North Island.

References

 Powell A. W. B., New Zealand Mollusca, William Collins Publishers Ltd, Auckland, New Zealand 1979 
 Powell A.W.B. (1930) New species of New Zealand Mollusca from shallow-water dredgings. Part 1. Transactions and Proceedings of the Royal Society of New Zealand 60: 532-543. page(s): 534

consobrina
Gastropods of New Zealand
Gastropods described in 1930